Starcher is a surname. It may refer to:
 Buddy Starcher (1906–2001), American country music singer
 Larry Starcher (1942-2022), American judge, served on the Supreme Court of Appeals of West Virginia
 Virginia Starcher (1930–2012), American politician, served on the West Virginia House of Delegates from 1986–1990